The 1961 Australian Drivers' Championship was a CAMS sanctioned Australian motor racing title  for drivers of Formula Libre cars. The title was contested over a five race series with the winner awarded the 1961 CAMS Gold Star.  It was the fifth Australian Drivers' Championship.

The series was dominated by Victorian racer Bill Patterson driving a Cooper T51 Climax. Patterson won three of the five races and was second and fourth in the other two. He finished the series 36 points ahead of Lex Davison (Aston Martin DBR4 & Cooper T51 Coventry Climax). Bib Stillwell (Cooper T51 Coventry Climax & Cooper T53 Coventry Climax) placed third in the points standings.

The two races not won by Patterson were Longford, won by British driver Roy Salvadori in a Cooper T51 Coventry Climax and Mallala, won by Davison, also driving a Cooper T51 Coventry Climax .

Calendar

A sixth championship race was originally scheduled to be held Phillip Island on 10 December. Although a "Racing Car Scratch Race" (The Isle of Wight Trophy) was held at the circuit on that date, a contemporary report in Australian Motor Sports magazine does not label this as a "Gold Star" race and it is omitted from 1961 Gold Star championship summaries at "members.optusnet.com.au/dandsshaw" and 
"www.oldracingcars.com"

Points system
Championship points were awarded on a 12-7-5-3-2-1 basis for the first six places in each race.
Points were awarded only to drivers racing under an Australian licence.
Ties were determined by the relevant competitors' placings in the Australian Grand Prix.

Championship results

The opening race at Longford was won by Englishman Roy Salvadori who was not eligible for championship points. First place points for that race were therefore awarded to the second placed driver, Bill Patterson.

Championship name
The championship was referred to by the Confederation of Australian Motor Sport in the 1961 CAMS Manual of Motor Sport simply as "The CAMS Gold Star". However historical records published by CAMS use the term "Australian Drivers’ Championship" and that title has been used in this article.

References

External links
 Bill Patterson at the Gold Star, www.terrywalkersplace.com

Australian Drivers' Championship
Drivers' Championship